Government High School is a state secondary school in Nassau, Bahamas. At one time, it was a selective grammar school and one of the country's leading institutions.

Early years as a selective school

Government High School became the Bahamas' first state school when it opened on 27 April 1925, providing for the education of blacks and girls who had been excluded from the colony's private schools.

It was a selective state school that became known for educating a generation of middle-class brown and black Bahamians before and immediately after the country achieved universal suffrage in 1961.

Modern comprehensive school

The school now exists as one of many public comprehensive secondary schools on the island of New Providence.

Headmasters and headmistresses

Albert Woods, from 1925
Dr. A. Deans Peggs, 1942-1958
Cecil Valentine Bethel, first Bahamian headmaster of GHS, from 1964
Anatol Rodgers, third Bahamian head and first headmistress, 1971-1975

Notable alumni

Paul Adderley, former Attorney-General of the Bahamas
Sir Gerald Cash, former Governor-General of the Bahamas
Dame Ivy Dumont, former Governor-General of the Bahamas
Sir Randol Fawkes, trade unionist and Cabinet minister
Sir Kendal Isaacs, former Solicitor-General, Attorney General, and Leader of the Opposition
Sir Lynden Pindling, first Prime Minister of an independent Bahamas
Dame Joan Sawyer, former Chief Justice of the Supreme Court of the Bahamas
Sir Orville Turnquest, former Governor-General of the Bahamas
Dr. Earle Farrington, noted surgeon.

References

Schools in the Bahamas
Educational institutions established in 1925
Nassau, Bahamas